Paracleistostoma depressum is an Asian-endemic species of crab common in Southeast Asia. They are distributed in Singapore, west coast of Malay peninsula and Hainan, Fujian provinces in Mainland China. They are found in seawater or mud area in brink water.

References

Ocypodoidea
Crustaceans described in 1895
Taxa named by Johannes Govertus de Man